Scythris bisincusella is a moth of the family Scythrididae. It was described by Bengt Å. Bengtsson in 2014. It is found in Kenya.

The larvae feed on Acacia xanthophloea.

References

bisincusella
Moths described in 2014